Paolo Tura (born 10 February 1971) is a Sammarinese archer. He competed at the 1992 Summer Olympics and the 1996 Summer Olympics.

References

1971 births
Living people
Sammarinese male archers
Olympic archers of San Marino
Archers at the 1992 Summer Olympics
Archers at the 1996 Summer Olympics
Place of birth missing (living people)